Jenny Wiley, born Jean "Jenny" Sellards (1760–1831), in Pennsylvania, was a pioneer woman who was taken captive by Native Americans in 1789, where she witnessed the death of her brother and children. She escaped after 11 months of captivity. Jenny Wiley State Resort Park in Prestonsburg, Kentucky is named in her honor.

Early life
Jenny Wiley was born to Hezekiah Sellards and Jean Brevard. Her family moved to Walkers Creek, in what is now Bland County, Virginia. In 1778, Jenny met and married Thomas Wiley, a Scots/Irish immigrant.

Soon after, they built a cabin in which to live to raise a family.

Capture

On October 1, 1789, Thomas set out for a trading post with a horse heavy laden with ginseng to barter for domestic necessaries. That afternoon, Jenny's brother-in-law, John Borders, heard owl-call signals in the woods that made him suspect Native Americans were in the area and planning an attack. He warned his sister-in-law to take her children and leave the cabin, but Jenny first wanted to finish some household chores.

A group of eleven Native Americans, composed of two Cherokees, three Shawnees, three Wyandots, and three Delawares, stormed the cabin. This was commonplace on the frontier, and would result in retaliatory attacks on Native villages. Jenny and her brother heard the attackers coming and tried to barricade the door, and also attempted to fight them off. They killed her younger brother of about fifteen years of age and her children, with the exception of her youngest child of about fifteen months. Jenny, who was expecting her fifth child, and the surviving child were then taken captive. There was some dispute amongst her captors about whether to kill her and her baby as they were slowing down the party, but they kept her and her baby alive until the baby became ill. At that point the captors killed the child while Jenny slept. She gave birth shortly thereafter, but that child was also murdered by scalping. The test was to put the baby on a piece of wood and send it down the river; if it cried, they would scalp it. If it did not cry, it would be allowed to live.

Escape
 Jenny was held captive by the Native Americans for several months in what is now Little Mud Lick Creek, Johnson County, Kentucky. She escaped to Harman's Blockhouse in Floyd County (now Johnson County), aided in crossing a major river by longhunter Henry Skaggs. With the help of the settlers at Harman's Blockhouse, Jenny made her way back to Walker's Creek, where she began a new family with her husband, Thomas. The Native bands had raided settlements in this area killing many settlers. The result was an indignation that caused many men to volunteer, along with militia units, to rid the area of these raiding parties so no more settlers would be murdered.

In approximately 1800, the Wiley family crossed the Big Sandy River, and settled in what is currently Johnson County, Kentucky. Jenny and her husband Thomas started a new family and had five children consisting of the following:

Jane Wiley, married Richard Williamson, son of American Revolutionary War patriot at the Battle of Point Pleasant also settled on Twelve Pole Creek
Sarah "Sally" Wiley, married twice (1) Christian Yost; (2) Samuel Murray and resided in Wayne County
Hezekiah Wiley, married Christine Nelson and settled on Twelve Pole Creek, Wayne County, (West) Virginia
William Stapleton, married Sarah Wiley
Adam Brevard Wiley married Neely Dillon, both left families in Johnson County Kentucky

Jenny Wiley lived in Johnson County with her family until her death in 1831. She was buried near the farm in River where she spent her final years.

State Park
Jenny Wiley State Resort Park was established in her honor just northeast of Prestonsburg near highway Route 23. The park is centered around  Dewey Lake, and includes the Jenny Wiley Theatre.

Jenny's horse race

Wiley is also honored by a Thoroughbred horse race named in her honor and run each year at Keeneland Race Course in Lexington, Kentucky. An event for fillies and mares, the race is called the Jenny Wiley Stakes and attracts some of the best female horses in American horse racing.

References

People from Johnson County, Kentucky
1760 births
1831 deaths
Captives of Native Americans
People of colonial Pennsylvania
Burials in Kentucky